Day By Day Jesus Ministries (formerly Day By Day Christian Ministries) (also known as DBD) is a non-denominational evangelical Christian mega-church organization headquartered in Makati, Philippines, and its main worship center at the Folk Arts Theatre, Cultural Center of the Philippines, Manila.

DBD was founded on June 6, 1985, in Riyadh, Saudi Arabia, as a small fellowship of OFWs. But the start of the growth of the organization was in the 1990s, when they had the organization set foot in the Philippines. Currently the organization is still doing missions within the Philippines and in Arab countries.

History 

Eduardo Lapiz, a pastor started facilitating Bible studies on a day-to-day basis until the number of attendees grew. In 1985, he organized prayer meetings in Riyadh with OFWs which ushered the beginning of the organization.

Church in the Philippines 

In 1991, Ptr. Lapiz returned to the country. He established the first congregation in a small room at McDouton Building in Quezon City. DBD grew rapidly, and its small space in McDouton Building was not enough. DBD eventually acquired a building in Leon Guinto Road in Manila, where the Church Administration was established. Again the space was not enough, and so another new building was acquired in Makati where the Church Administration moved its base. Church missions were spreading within the country and within the Middle East at the time. Worship services began in cinema theaters like Shangri-La Mall, Glorietta and Makati Square (Formerly Makati Cinema Square) malls until 2005, when the church leased the Folk Arts Theater found at the Cultural Center of the Philippines which they dedicated as the Bulwagan ng Panginoon (Hall of the Lord). The Bulwagan hosted Sunday worship services and performance from the church's groups. The Church still has the Makati Center as one of its outreaches, but the church is more known for their Folk Arts Theater Church which became the flagship church of Day by Day.

In 2012, Day By Day Church opens a new branch in Better Living Tricycle Terminal, Brgy. Don Bosco, Paranaque City.

Global expansion 

Though DBD is currently headquartered in the Philippines, it started in Saudi Arabia, so global expansion did not meant outside of the Philippines. The churches in North America were built in the 1990s as well as there were new churches there. Expansions in Japan is also fast-approaching by the early 2000s. The church also is expanding in non-Muslim countries such as in Singapore and New Zealand.

Ministries 

Day by Day Christian Ministries is in the forefront in propagating the use of Filipino arts in worship. The church aims to redeem Philippine culture, dance and music for the use in Christian worship and liturgy with its ministry, KALOOB Philippine Dance and Music Ministry. Kaloob (literally "Gift") focuses on researching, reinterpreting and promoting indigenous Philippine music.

Radio programs 

DBD operates some radio programs around the Philippines, including the program "Day by Day" on 702 DZAS and also has three websites for the church.

See also 

DZAS
Evangelicalism

References

External links

Day by Day Official Website

Christian denominations founded in the Philippines
Evangelical denominations in Asia
Evangelical organizations established in the 20th century
Evangelical megachurches in the Philippines
Christian organizations established in 1985
1985 establishments in Saudi Arabia
Churches in Metro Manila